Marco Priis Jørgensen (born 2 June 1991) is a Danish football goalkeeper who plays for Brattvåg IL.

Career
Jørgensen signed for HamKam on 12 March 2018. He left the club at the end of 2018, when his contract expired. However in March 2019, he renewed his contract with the club.

On 19 July 2019, Jørgensen joined Danish 1st Division club FC Roskilde after a trial.

References

External links
 Marco Pris Jørgensen at altomfotball.no 
 
 

Articles using sports links with data from Wikidata
1991 births
Danish men's footballers
Living people
Association football goalkeepers
Boldklubben af 1893 players
Hvidovre IF players
HB Køge players
FC Midtjylland players
Mjøndalen IF players
Hamarkameratene players
Norwegian First Division players
FC Roskilde players
Eliteserien players
Arendal Fotball players
IL Hødd players
Brattvåg IL players
Danish expatriate men's footballers
Expatriate footballers in Norway
Danish expatriate sportspeople in Norway